Ficheux is a commune in the Pas-de-Calais department in the Hauts-de-France region of France.

Geography

Population
The inhabitants are called Ficheusois.

Places of interest
 The church of St.Maurice, rebuilt along with most of the commune, after World War I.
 The Commonwealth War Graves Commission cemetery.

See also
 Communes of the Pas-de-Calais department

References

External links

 The Bucquoy Road CWGC cemetery at Ficheux

Communes of Pas-de-Calais